Tinkers Creek State Park is a public recreation area that under the name Tinkers Creek Area is part of Liberty Park in Streetsboro, Portage County, Ohio, United States. The area's small lakes and marshes provide food and habitat for beavers and thousands of waterfowl. The park offers archery, spring-fed fishing lake, hiking trails, and picnicking areas.

History
Before the state park opened, a private park called Colonial Spring Gardens existed on the land. The State of Ohio acquired the land in 1966 and officially opened the state park in 1973. In 2014, Summit Metro Parks signed an agreement with the Ohio Department of Natural Resources to manage Tinkers Creek  State Park and the adjacent Tinkers Creek State Nature Preserve for a period of 25 years.

References

External links
Tinkers Creek State Park Ohio Department of Natural Resources
Liberty Park Summit Metro Parks
Liberty Park Map Summit Metro Parks

State parks of Ohio
Protected areas of Portage County, Ohio
Protected areas established in 1973
1973 establishments in Ohio